General Sir Charles Patrick Ralph Palmer,  (29 April 1933 – 23 November 1999) was a senior British Army officer. He served as Constable and Governor of Windsor Castle 1992 to 1999. He had been Commander-in-Chief, Allied Forces Northern Europe.

Military career
Educated at Marlborough College and Sandhurst, Palmer was commissioned into the Argyll and Sutherland Highlanders in 1953. He went on to serve in British Guiana, Suez and Cyprus. He returned to Sandhurst as an instructor in 1961 and then served with his regiment in Borneo and then Aden. After a spell in Whitehall, he returned to the Argyll and Sutherland Highlanders as commanding officer of the 1st Battalion from 1972 to 1974. In 1977 he became Commander 7th Armoured Brigade.

In 1980 he was given command of the British Army Advisory Training Team in Zimbabwe, advising President Mugabe. In 1982 he was appointed General Officer Commanding North East District, in 1983 he was dual-hatted as General Officer Commanding North East District and Commander 2nd Infantry Division and in 1984 he was made Commandant of the Staff College, Camberley. In 1986 he became Military Secretary and in 1989 he was promoted to full general and became Commander-in-Chief Allied Forces Northern Europe before retiring in 1992.

From 1982 to 1992 he was also Colonel of the Argyll and Sutherland Highlanders.

Later life
He was the Constable and Governor of Windsor Castle from 1992 to 1999. After the great fire in 1992 he co-ordinated much of the re-building work. He retired from this position due to ill health in 1999 and was succeeded by Air Marshal Sir Richard Johns. Before his retirement he was appointed a Knight Commander of the Royal Victorian Order (KCVO) on 13 August 1999.

Family
In 1960 he married Sonia Wigglesworth; they had one son. Following the death of his first wife, he married Joanna Baines in 1966; they had two daughters.

References 

 

|-

|-
 

|-

|-

 

1933 births
1999 deaths
British Army generals
Knights Commander of the Royal Victorian Order
Knights Commander of the Order of the British Empire
Graduates of the Royal Military Academy Sandhurst
People educated at Marlborough College
Argyll and Sutherland Highlanders officers
British military personnel of the Cyprus Emergency
British military personnel of the Suez Crisis
Commandants of the Staff College, Camberley